The Audi RC8 2.0 TFSI is a prototype four-stroke 2.0-litre single-turbocharged inline-4 gasoline racing engine, developed and produced jointly by Volkswagen and Audi Sport GmbH for Deutsche Tourenwagen Masters. The RC8 2.0 TFSI engine is full custom-built but partially borrows the cylinder blocks from Volkswagen-Audi EA888 2.0 R4 16v TSI/TFSI road car engine which had a same displacement. Audi RC8 2.0 TFSI was shakedown on 15 November 2018 and later made public unveil on 20 March 2019 after more engine dyno test. Audi RC8 TFSI is the first-ever turbocharged DTM engine to date, replacing the aging Audi DTM V8 engine after nineteen-years of service which conform the "Class 1" regulations that shared with Japanese Super GT under Nippon Race Engine (NRE) formula.

The RC8 2.0 TFSI engine also featuring push-to-pass system which produces  later  for more overtaking manoeuvre improvement.

Development

History
In December 2014, Audi DTM Project Leader Andreas Roos and his fellow engineers at Audi Sport take the first step towards the new Audi RS 5 DTM, which marks Audi's biggest and most important touring car project in recent history. Shortly before the project's launch, the course has been set in terms of crucial elements of a joint future of the DTM and the Japanese Super GT racing series according to the Class 1 regulations. The first preparation of Audi RC8 2.0 TFSI inline-4 turbo engine was commenced in January 2015. The initial and key element of the mission: a new two-litre four-cylinder internal combustion engine with an exhaust gas turbocharger for racing, starting in the 2017 DTM season that was envisaged at that time.

Since 2008, Ulrich Baretzky, Head of Engine Technology at Audi Sport for more than 30 years, and his team have been pursuing the project of a successor to the four-litre V8 power-plant that has been used in the DTM since 2000. After the DTM decided to introduce new turbo engines at the beginning of the 2019 season, Audi, in January 2017, launches the final development stage for the future racing version of its RS 5 Coupé, which the brand with the four rings has relied on in the DTM since 2013. Internally the project is named ‘RC8’. Initially, the main focus at Audi Sport continues to be on the engine. “For the total vehicle, we started initial concept studies in the middle of 2017,” relates Andreas Roos.

Progress of engine development and dyno testing
Two litres of displacement, four cylinders, a compact in-line configuration, petrol direct injection analogous to the TFSI concept from the production vehicles, turbocharging using an exhaust gas turbocharger: at Audi, this is the technical foundation of its new high-tech engine for the DTM. More engine output combined with reduced engine weight and lower specific fuel consumption intended to make international touring car racing more attractive, whilst strengthening the reference to production vehicles with high-efficiency two-litre turbo engines worldwide: this puts the racing and business philosophy in a nutshell.

In January 2017, the testing of the so-called full engine of the new design, which had begun in March 2015, continues on Audi Sport's dynos. Before the full engine, research was done on a one-cylinder version of the new DTM four-cylinder unit. The tests with the one-cylinder engine were focused on the combustion process.

In the Spring of 2017, Audi Sport tests its new DTM four-cylinder turbo unit on the dyno, including the cooling system. To the extent possible, everything is configured exactly the way it will subsequently be positioned under the bonnet of the Audi RS 5 DTM. This means: the engine including the water and oil circuit, the exhaust system together with the turbocharger plus the intercooler system and the wastegate. The complete package of the new DTM racing engine consists of some 2,000 single parts.

The final rig testing stage for the new engine starts in the summer of 2017: the interaction between the turbo four-cylinder unit and the proven sequential six-speed gearbox is brought into perfect harmony. Audi Sport uses an axle test rig for this purpose on which the entire propulsion system is ‘driven’ with absolute realism and made ready for racing.

Following a total of about two years of development work, the forward-thinking result is obtained: Audi's new two-litre four-cylinder turbo engine for the DTM with its more than 610 horsepower (450 kW) delivers some 100 horsepower more than the four-litre V8 did with twice as many cylinders and twice the cubic capacity, and with 650 Nm it develops nearly 25 per cent more torque. The new design only weighs 85 kilogrammes, about half as much as its predecessor.

Plus, Audi has taken another significant step forward: “The DTM engine has extremely low specific consumption, which is now in ranges that used to be typical of diesel units. In terms of weight and lightweight design – especially under the aspect of avoiding  emissions – we’re pointing out a few approaches that in future will hopefully also find their way into road cars – as in the case of the first TFSI for Le Mans and TDI,” emphasises chief engine developer Ulrich Baretzky.

Test car assembly
In September 2018, all of the modifications required for the turbo engine and adjustments to the Class 1 regulations have been implemented in detail. The first 2019-gen Audi RS 5 DTM starts being assembled. The key differences between it and the 2018-spec car: the entire front end has been modified to suit the more compact four-cylinder turbo power-plant and its higher cooling requirements. Particularly conspicuous are the additional air intakes at the front for the intercooler, which make the Audi RS 5 DTM appear even more aggressive than its predecessor.

The car's aerodynamics design has also been completely updated by the autumn of 2018. According to the Class 1 regulations, the underfloor, the front and rear diffusors and the rear wing, whose width has increased by an impressive 52 centimetres, have been redefined for the 2019-spec DTM Audi. These modified components are also specification parts, just like the monocoque, safety cage, catalytic converter, powertrain, gearbox, brakes, suspensions, rims, wheels and fuel tank. In that way, the DTM consistently continues to pursue its path towards further cost reduction and increased competitiveness.

“Accommodating the heavily modified cooling system in the engine bay posed a challenge in particular. Because of this, we allowed for about one more week than usual to assemble the first car,” says Roos. The project leader explains more precisely: “For example, due to the higher exhaust gas temperatures, we had to pay special attention to proper thermal shielding at every exposed area around the exhaust system.” In early October 2018, after five weeks of assembly work, Audi Sport is able to start its new turbo engine for the first time in the modified Audi RS 5 DTM. The audience for what is now the most powerful DTM Audi of all time is exclusively located at the motorsport headquarters in Neuburg an der Donau: the employees of Audi Sport.

Applications
Audi RS5 Turbo DTM

References

External links
Audi Sport Official Website

RC8 TFSI
RC8 TFSI
Gasoline engines by model
Deutsche Tourenwagen Masters
Straight-four engines